Patcheeswarar temple is a famous temple in the heart of the town named Cheyyar in Tiruvannamalai District, Tamil Nadu state, India built during the times of Pallava dynasty

See also
 Cheyyar

Cheyyar
Hindu temples in Tiruvannamalai district